Dominic Samuel Fritz (born 28 December 1983) is a German-born politician who has been serving as the mayor of Timișoara since 2020, following the latest Romanian local elections. A member of the Save Romania Union, he is the only mayor in Romania without Romanian citizenship.

Prior to becoming the mayor of Timișoara in 2020, Fritz was a member of Alliance 90/The Greens between 2009 and 2019 and also a political advisor to former German president Horst Köhler (whose parents were relocated to Nazi Germany from Rîșcani, northern Bessarabia, now Republic of Moldova) between 2016 and 2019. Fritz is a political scientist by profession.

Early life and education 
Fritz was born on 28 December 1983 in Lörrach, Baden-Württemberg, West Germany. His parents were both teachers. Fritz grew up as the third child of a total of eight siblings in Görwihl in the Southern Black Forest. In 1999, at the age of 16, a scholarship from the Bundestag enabled him to spend a year in the United States. He passed his Abitur at the Jesuit Kolleg St. Blasien in 2003. In the same year, Fritz came to Timișoara for the first time as part of a voluntary social year with the Jesuit European Volunteers, where he worked in a children's hospice in the Freidorf district run by Salvatorian priest and humanitarian , which takes care of orphans and street children in the city. From then on, he will visit Timișoara several times a year, finally buying an apartment in the Iosefin district in 2015.

Between 2004 and 2008 he studied political and administrative sciences at the University of Konstanz with a scholarship from the German Academic Scholarship Foundation. His bachelor thesis addressed social policies in Romania. Later, in 2009, he obtained a master's degree in post-conflict studies at the University of York. In 2006, he did a seven-month internship at the Pentru Voi Foundation, where he established the first mentoring program for adults with intellectual disabilities in Romania.

Political career 
From 2009 to 2019 Fritz was a member of Alliance 90/The Greens, in whose Frankfurt district association he was elected as an assessor in 2011. Here he helped organize the campaign for local elections. From 2009 to 2012 he also worked as a consultant for the German Agency for International Cooperation (GIZ) on international development projects and peacekeeping missions in Africa. After that, from 2016 to 2019, he was an advisor and chief of staff of former German president Horst Köhler.

Amid the countrywide anti-corruption protests in the winter of 2017, he joined the progressive Save Romania Union (USR), which nominated him as a candidate for the upcoming local election, for which he moved from Berlin to Timișoara in 2019. His candidature was also supported by the local branch of the Democratic Forum of Germans in Romania (FDGR/DFDR). In the 27 September 2020 election, Fritz won with 53.25% of the votes against incumbent Nicolae Robu, the National Liberal Party (PNL) candidate, who had sought a third term in office. Robu, former rector of the Politehnica University of Timișoara, had previously refused an electoral debate with Fritz and in a nationalist campaign called him a "foreign adventurer" who regarded Romania as a cow to be milked. His investiture was delayed by appeals filed in court by PNL sympathizers, since Fritz does not have Romanian citizenship. However, according to Law no. 115 of 2015, EU citizens have the right to be elected as mayor, local councilor, county councilor, and president of the county council anywhere in Romania, provided they have their official residence in that area. The appeals were ultimately rejected, and Fritz took the oath in the Capitol Hall of the Banatul Philharmonic on 30 October 2020.

Following the 2022 Russian invasion of Ukraine and the subsequent refugee crisis, he helped establish coalition of support Timișoara For Ukraine, an initiative that brought NGOs, religious communities, local entrepreneurs and citizens together to support Ukrainian citizens and local authorities, especially from the sister city of Chernivtsi. Its main objectives are buying vital equipment for Ukraine and developing a complex system for receiving, supporting and integrating refugees arriving in Timișoara.

Being a vocal campaigner for a less car-centric urban mobility, he has attracted European funding from the Recovery and Resilience Plan for Romania (PNRR) in order to renew the city's public transport fleet. The amount of 308 million lei will be used to buy 30 electric buses, 8 trolleybuses and 17 trams. PNRR is a plan approved in 2021 for Romania's economic recovery package ensuing COVID-19 pandemic, and is part of Next Generation EU economic recovery package.

In 2021, the local branch of USR elected Fritz as its president, who ran unopposed.

Personal life 

Fritz, who plays piano and cello, has performed with various orchestras and chamber ensembles. He also sang in semi-professional choirs, conducted several ensembles, composed choral music and published two CDs with his own compositions in Germany. In 2004, he created the Timișoara Gospel Project, initially a gospel choir made up of institutionalized children which over time grew in size and would hold concerts with the Banatul Philharmonic for charitable causes. Since 2012 he has been president of the TGP Cultural Association. For his commitment to culture, he was awarded the city's diploma of excellence in 2014 at Timișoara City Hall.

Since 2021, Fritz has been married to Yiran Lin, a Chinese-born UN diplomat. Fritz and Lin live in a house in the Elisabetin district of Timișoara. They have a daughter together, Maya Luming.

In addition to his mother tongue, German, Fritz is fluent in Romanian, English, and French.

Fritz is a practicing Roman Catholic.

References

External links 
 

1983 births
People from Lörrach
German Roman Catholics
German emigrants to Romania
Save Romania Union politicians
Mayors of Timișoara
Living people